Muhammad Taj (born 10 December 1943) is a Pakistani wrestler. He competed in the men's freestyle 70 kg at the 1968 Summer Olympics.

References

External links
 

1943 births
Living people
Pakistani male sport wrestlers
Olympic wrestlers of Pakistan
Wrestlers at the 1968 Summer Olympics
Sportspeople from Gujarat